Palermo is a census-designated place (CDP) in Butte County, California, United States. The population was 5,382 at the 2010 census, down from 5,720 at the 2000 census.

Geography

Climate
According to the Köppen Climate Classification system, Palermo has a warm-summer Mediterranean climate, abbreviated "Csa" on climate maps.

History
The town was named after Palermo, Sicily due to its excellent climate for growing olives. The first post office was established in 1888.
The area was home to a country club, two railroad stations, gold mining, a brick yard, library, general mercantile store, school and even a semi-pro baseball team. The rich clay soil attracted the planting of olive and orange orchards and a thriving zucca melon industry.
Mining magnate George Hearst purchased 700 acres in 1888, and then subdivided.
There is an annual festival held every September centered at Palermo Park to help raise funds to support the Palermo Community Council's Sheriff Substation.

Demographics

2010
The 2010 United States Census reported that Palermo had a population of 5,382. The racial makeup of Palermo was 3,901 (72.5%) White, 39 (0.7%) African American, 221 (4.1%) Native American, 246 (4.6%) Asian, 4 (0.1%) Pacific Islander, 642 (11.9%) from other races, and 329 (6.1%) from two or more races. Hispanic or Latino of any race were 1,281 persons (23.8%).

The Census reported that 5,382 people (100% of the population) lived in households, 0 (0%) lived in non-institutionalized group quarters, and 0 (0%) were institutionalized.

There were 1,940 households, out of which 635 (32.7%) had children under the age of 18 living in them, 1,023 (52.7%) were opposite-sex married couples living together, 212 (10.9%) had a female householder with no husband present, 167 (8.6%) had a male householder with no wife present.  There were 141 (7.3%) unmarried opposite-sex partnerships, and 7 (0.4%) same-sex married couples or partnerships. 416 households (21.4%) were made up of individuals, and 184 (9.5%) had someone living alone who was 65 years of age or older. The average household size was 2.77.  There were 1,402 families (72.3% of all households); the average family size was 3.18.

The population was spread out, with 1,310 people (24.3%) under the age of 18, 463 people (8.6%) aged 18 to 24, 1,157 people (21.5%) aged 25 to 44, 1,487 people (27.6%) aged 45 to 64, and 965 people (17.9%) who were 65 years of age or older.  The median age was 40.9 years. For every 100 females, there were 105.1 males.  For every 100 females age 18 and over, there were 104.0 males.

The homeowner vacancy rate was 1.7%; the rental vacancy rate was 8.0%.  4,049 people (75.2% of the population) lived in owner-occupied housing units and 1,333 people (24.8%) lived in rental housing units.

2000
As of the census of 2000, there were 5,720 people, 1,989 households, and 1,501 families residing in the CDP. The racial makeup of the CDP was 77.99% White, 0.58% Black or African American, 5.89% Native American, 2.40% Asian, 0.12% Pacific Islander, 7.87% from other races, and 5.16% from two or more races.  15.59% of the population were Hispanic or Latino of any race.

There were 1,989 households, out of which 31.7% had children under the age of 18 living with them, 57.2% were married couples living together, 11.8% had a female householder with no husband present, and 24.5% were non-families. 19.4% of all households were made up of individuals, and 9.0% had someone living alone who was 65 years of age or older.  The average household size was 2.87 and the average family size was 3.27.

In the CDP, the population was spread out, with 28.3% under the age of 18, 7.7% from 18 to 24, 22.9% from 25 to 44, 25.3% from 45 to 64, and 15.8% who were 65 years of age or older.  The median age was 38 years. For every 100 females, there were 104.3 males.  For every 100 females age 18 and over, there were 99.6 males.

The median income for a household in the CDP was $30,588, and the median income for a family was $35,250. Males had a median income of $31,135 versus $19,950 for females. The per capita income for the CDP was $15,206.  About 19.3% of families and 25.6% of the population were below the poverty line, including 41.2% of those under age 18 and 6.3% of those age 65 or over.

The vast majority of high school students who live in Palermo go to Las Plumas High School.

References

External links
Palermo Community Website

Census-designated places in Butte County, California
Census-designated places in California